List of Chrysler factories contains all the vehicles manufactured by Chrysler LLC (currently "Stellantis North America") and the brands of the group before it merged to Fiat S.p.A. to form FCA.

This list should only include vehicles under the Chrysler, Jeep, Dodge, and Ram brands.

For a list of factories of other Stellantis brands, see list of Fiat Group assembly sites.

Current factories 
This list contains all current Stellantis North and South American factories.

Closed factories

Joint-ventures

See also
 List of Fiat Group assembly sites
 List of Ford factories
 List of GM factories

References

 01
Chrysler Factories